Guan Huabing (born November 1956) is a Chinese diplomat who served as Chinese Ambassador to Laos from 2013 to 2017.

Biography
Born in Anhui in November 1956, Guan joined the foreign service in 1988 and has served primarily in North Korea and South Korea. In June 2013, he succeeded  as Chinese Ambassador to Laos according the National People's Congress decision, serving in that position from 2013 to 2017.

Honours and awards 
 January 2017 Friendship Medal

References

1956 births
Living people
People from Anhui
Ambassadors of China to Laos